James Laurie Snell (January 15, 1925 in Wheaton, Illinois – March 19, 2011 in Hanover, New Hampshire) was an American mathematician.

Biography
J. Laurie Snell was the son of Roy Snell, an adventure author, and Lucille, a concert pianist. Lucille taught the three sons (Jud, John and Laurie) to play piano, cello, and violin. The family had a life-lease on a cabin in Isle Royale National Park where they would go for summer holidays.

Graduate work
Snell studied mathematics at the University of Illinois with Joseph L. Doob from 1948 through 1951; Doob introduced him to martingales, an aspect of probability theory. 
Doob assigned such topics by having students attempt to solve a series of problems that he kept on file cards. Snell earned his Ph.D. in 1951 ("Applications of Martingale System Theorems"), with Doob as his supervisor.

Dartmouth College
At Dartmouth College Snell became involved in a mathematics department project to develop a course on modern mathematics used in biological and social sciences. He worked with John G. Kemeny and Gerald L. Thompson to write Introduction to Finite Mathematics (1957) which described probability theory, linear algebra, and applications in sociology, genetics, psychology, anthropology, and economics. They found "the basic ideas of finite mathematics were easier to state and theorems about them considerably easier to prove than their infinite counterparts." A French translation was made by M. C. Loyau and published in 1960 by Donod.

Another colleague at Dartmouth, Hazleton Mirkil, joined the team to write Finite Mathematical Structures (1959) for sophomores at Dartmouth studying science. Infinite problems are considered after their finite counterparts are fully developed in the text. In 1962 the publisher Prentice-Hall issued a third book from a Dartmouth team: Kemeny, Snell, Thompson, and Arthur Schleifer Jr. wrote Finite Mathematics with Business Applications which included applications: computer circuits, critical path analysis, flow diagrams for computing and accounting procedures, Monte Carlo simulation of decision processes, reliability, decision theory, waiting line theory, a simple approach to mathematics of finance, matrix games, and the simplex method for solving linear programming problems. A second edition of the first text came out in 1966.

Writings
In 1959 Snell published a survey article on Markov chains. He worked the material into a book Finite Markov Chains with Kemeny. As the "first self-contained account in English", it attracted wide interest. While one reviewer said "the exposition is of high quality", other reviewers found fault: Too little attention paid to assumptions inherent in a model. "Interest builds steadily as one peruses the book." But "little attention to historical development." "From the point of view of an undergraduate ... the opening chapter on mathematical prerequisites is rather frightening." "Does not supersede the corresponding chapters in Feller's classic Introduction to Probability; "No index and not even the sketchiest bibliography."

Snell started Chance News in 1992 to "review news and journal articles pertaining to probability and statistics in the real world." One feature is Forsooth for statistical gaffes in media reports, a column originally found in the newsletter of the Royal Statistical Society. In 2005 Chance News was moved to Chance Wiki where there is an archive of Forsooths and previous News. Out of collaborations in Chance News with Charles M. Grinstead and William P. Peterson, a book Probability Tales (2011) was published by American Mathematical Society in the Student Mathematical Library. The book covers four topics: streaks in sports as streaks of successful Bernoulli trials (like hitting streaks), constructing stock market models, estimating expected value of a lottery ticket, and reliability of fingerprint identification.

Legacy
Snell retired in 1995 and was elected as a fellow of the American Statistical Association in 1996.

The Snell envelope, used in stochastics and mathematical finance, is the smallest supermartingale dominating the price process. The Snell envelope refers to results in a 1952 paper Applications of martingale system theorems.

Books
 1957: (with John G. Kemeny and Gerald L. Thompson) Introduction to Finite Mathematics Prentice Hall Online
 1959: (with Kemeny, Thompson & Hazleton Mirkil) Finite Mathematical Structures
 1960: (with John G. Kemeny) Finite Markov Chains, D. van Nostrand Company 
 1962: (with Kemeny, Thompson & Arthur Schleifer Jr.) Finite Mathematics with Business Applications
 1962: (with John G. Kemeny) Mathematical Models in the Social Sciences, Ginn and Company
 1966: (with J.G. Kemeny & A.W. Knapp) Denumerable Markov Chains, second edition 1976, Springer-Verlag
 1980: (with Ross Kindermann) Markov Random Fields and Their Applications, American Mathematical Society , 
 1980: (with Ross P. Kindermann) "On the relation between Markov random fields and social networks", Journal of Mathematical Sociology 7(1): 1–13.
 1984: (with Peter G. Doyle) Random Walks and Electrical Networks, Mathematical Association of America 
 1988: Introduction To Probability, Random House 
 1997: (with Charles Grinsted) Introduction to Probability second edition, American Mathematical Society,  (online )
 2011: (with C.M. Grinstead & W.P. Peterson) Probability Tales, American Mathematical Society

Notes

References

External links 
 
Website at Dartmouth College
 

Probability theorists
20th-century American mathematicians
21st-century American mathematicians
1925 births
2011 deaths
Writers from Wheaton, Illinois
Dartmouth College alumni
University of Illinois alumni
Fellows of the American Statistical Association
Mathematicians from Illinois
American textbook writers